Katerina (Greek: Κατερίνα,  Katerína; Russian, Bulgarian and Macedonian: Катерина,  Katerina) is a feminine given name. It is a Greek variant of Ekaterini and a Russian and Bulgarian short form of Ekaterina or Yekaterina.

The name Katerina is often associated with the Greek word katharos, meaning "pure" (see: Katherine#Origin and meaning).

Notable people 

Notable people named Katerina include:

 Katerina Anghelaki-Rooke (1939-2020) Greek poet, translator and lecturer
 Katerina Bassi (born 1977), Greek taekwondo athlete
 Katerina Batzeli (born 1958), Greek politician
 Aikaterini Bliamou (born 1982), Greek swimmer
 Katerina Dalaka (born 1992), Greek hurdler
 Katerina Deli (born 1975), Greek former basketball player
 Katerina Didaskalou (born 1960), Greek actress
 Katerina Georgiadou (born 1982), Greek fashion model
 Katerina Giota (born 1990), Greek volleyball player
 Katerina Gogou (1940-1993) Greek poet, author and actress
 Katerina Graham, American actress, singer and model
 Katerina Harvati (born 1970), Greek paleoanthropologist
 Katerina Kanonidou, Greek fashion model
 Katerina Kechris, American statistician
 Katerina Koffa (born 1969), retired Greek sprinter
 Katerina Kontochristopoulou (born 1997), Greek fencer
 Katerina Lehou (born 1967), Greek actress
 Katerina Maleeva, Bulgarian tennis player
 Katerina Michalopoulou (born 1972), Greek Miss Hellas winner
 Katerina Moutsatsou (born 1972), Greek actress
 Katerina Nikolaidou (born 1992) Greek rower athlete
 Katerina Papakosta (born 1961), greek politician
 Kateřina Pivoňková, Czech backstroke swimmer
 Katerina Sakellaropoulou (born 1956), Greek judge, President of Greece
 Katerina Savvaidou (born 1972), Greek politician
 Katerina Sotiriou (born 1984), Greek basketball player
 Katerina Stefanidi (born 1990), Greek pole vaulter
 Katerina Stikoudi (born 1985) Greek fashion model
 Katerina Thanou (born 1975), Greek sprinter
 Katerina Voggoli (born 1970), Greek retired discus thrower
 Katerina Yioulaki (born 1938), Greek actress

Other:
 Katerini, a city in Greece, formerly named Katerina
 Katerina, a novel by Israeli author Aharon Appelfeld
 "Katerina", a season two episode of the TV series The Vampire Diaries
 Katerina Petrova, AKA Katherine Pierce, a character in The Vampire Diaries that the episode centers around
 Katarina, a companion in Doctor Who

Songs about Katerina 
"Aman, Katerina mou" [Alas, my Katerina] by Stellakis Perpiniadis
"Ego kai i Katerina" [Me and Katerina] by Mihalis Violaris
"H Katerina" by Dimitris Zevgas
"Katerina Katerinaki" by Paschalis
"Katerina Thessalonikia" [Katerina from Thessaloniki] by Vasilis Tsitsanis
"Katerina" by Aliki Vougiouklaki
"Katerina" by Nikos Oikonomidis
"Katerina" by Stk
"Katerina" by Yiannis Savvidakis
"Katerina, karderina" [Katerina, the goldfinch] by Chronis Aidonidis
"Katerino Mome" by Gloria & Nikolay Slaveev
"Katyusha" Russian folk song
"Mila, Katerina" [Speak, Katerina] by Manolis Mitsias
"Omorfi mou Katerina" [My pretty Katerina] by Antonis Kalogiannis
"Pame gia ypno, Katerina" [Let's go to sleep, Katerina] by Giannis Poulopoulos
"Rina Katerina mou" [My Rina Katerina] by Dimitra Galani
"Rina Katerina" by Kostas Bigalis
"Ta matia sou Katerinio" [Your eyes, Katerina] by Michalis Violaris
"Thessaloniki - Katerina" by Stelios Dionysiou
"To Katerinio" by Chainides
"To oneiro tis Katerinas" [Katerina's dream] by Chainides
"Tora pou smigoun oi kairoi (Katerinio)" by Nikos Ksylouris

References

Feminine given names
Given names of Greek language origin
Russian feminine given names
Ukrainian feminine given names
Bulgarian feminine given names
Macedonian feminine given names
Greek feminine given names
Serbian feminine given names